The statue of John of Nepomuk is an outdoor sculpture, installed in 1683 on the north side of the Charles Bridge in Prague, Czech Republic. It was the first of the many Baroque images of saints to be installed on the bridge.

Description and history

The bronze statue is based on a clay model made in 1681 by Matthias Rauchmiller. The sculptor Jan Brokoff created a large wooden sculpture based on Rauchmiller's model, which was then cast in bronze in Nuremberg.

Rauchmiller's clay model is now in the collection of the National Gallery of Prague.

Brokoff's wooden statue (gilded) has been displayed on the altar of Prague's Church of St. John of Nepomuk On the Rock since 1819.

References

External links

 

Christian sculptures
Monuments and memorials in Prague
Sculptures of men in Prague
Statues on the Charles Bridge